The 2015 Spanish Grand Prix, formally titled the Formula 1 Gran Premio de España Pirelli 2015, was a Formula One motor race held on 10 May 2015 at the Circuit de Barcelona-Catalunya in Montmeló, Spain. The race was the fifth round of the  season and marked the forty-fifth running of the Spanish Grand Prix as a round of the Formula One World Championship and the twenty-fifth running at Catalunya. Mercedes driver Nico Rosberg took his first win of the season, his first in Spain and the ninth of his career. His team-mate Lewis Hamilton finished second after a bad start, followed by Sebastian Vettel in third.

Report

Background
Mercedes were expected to be dominant in Barcelona, since it was at the circuit that their advantage per lap had been biggest in 2014 and they had shown strong form at the two pre-season tests at the circuit.

After problems with their engine in the first races, which saw Daniel Ricciardo down to his last power unit after just four outings, Renault introduced a new, modified engine for the Spanish Grand Prix, aiming to improve both reliability and drivability.

Ferrari brought new parts to Barcelona, but Kimi Räikkönen was unsatisfied with the handling of his car, switching back to the earlier setup for the third practice session. He later conceded that "maybe it would have been better with the new bits." McLaren arrived in Barcelona with a new dark grey livery in order to "improv[e] its visual impact [...] for the floodlights increasingly used in twilight and night races," a team representative said.

Tyres
On 22 April, Pirelli announced that the teams would be using the hard and medium tyres for this race, the same choice as the year before.

Free practice

Per the regulations for the 2015 season, three practice sessions were held, two 1.5-hour sessions on Friday and another one-hour session before qualifying on Saturday. Nico Rosberg was fastest on Friday morning, outpacing his teammate Lewis Hamilton by 0.07 seconds. Rosberg raised the interest of the race stewards when he failed to stay to the left of the bollard at the pit lane entrance returning to pit lane after one of his runs. Mercedes lived up to the expectations by lapping almost a second quicker than the next fastest cars, the two Ferrari drivers.

Lewis Hamilton was quickest in the second session on Friday afternoon. The extreme heat was especially hard on the tyres, which led to many drivers complaining about a lack of grip on track. Sebastian Vettel split the two Mercedes cars and finished second fastest, four-tenths of a second slower than Hamilton, with Rosberg a further three tenths down. Daniel Ricciardo struggled with his engine yet again, which needed to be changed mid-session, leaving him with only ten minutes of running. McLaren were yet to score in 2015, but with Jenson Button finishing seventh and Fernando Alonso in eleventh place, they proved to be closer to the point ranks than in previous races. Romain Grosjean suffered from technical problems on his Lotus, which ended in the engine cover of his car shattering on the start-finish straight, bringing out a red flag.

The third practice session, on Saturday morning, showed that Mercedes' advantage on the softer, medium tyres was less significant than on the hard compound, meaning Vettel was able to lap within two-tenths of a second of Rosberg, who was fastest. Hamilton spun in turn three, compromising his session. He finished third fastest, two-tenths down on his teammate. Kimi Räikkönen, who was fifth fastest, was once more unsatisfied with the setup of his car, as he could be heard on the radio telling his team "Excellent. How can we be in wrong settings?"

Qualifying

Qualifying consisted of three parts, 18, 15 and 12 minutes in length respectively, with five drivers eliminated from competing after each of the first two sessions. During the first session (Q1), Mercedes was able to proceed into the next part without having to use the softer and faster tyre compound. The same applied for Sebastian Vettel, while his Ferrari teammate Kimi Räikkönen was once again unhappy with his setup and recorded his time on the softer medium tyres. McLaren's upward trend continued, as both cars progressed into Q2, the first time the team achieved this in 2015. The Manor Marussia drivers took their familiar place at the back of the grid, Will Stevens in 19th almost three seconds off the time of the next-slowest car. Both Force India cars as well as the Sauber of Marcus Ericsson did not make it into Q2 either.

The second part of qualifying saw both Mercedes drivers and Valtteri Bottas make only one timed run, which proved sufficient to get into Q3 comfortably. The second Sauber of Felipe Nasr was eliminated as were both McLarens and both Lotus cars, meaning that the last five rows on the grid would each be taken by pairs of teammates.

For the last session of qualifying, the top ten drivers had twelve minutes to set their times. Nico Rosberg recorded provisional pole on his first outing, a quarter of a second in front of teammate Lewis Hamilton. Unlike their teammates, both Felipe Massa in the Williams and Kimi Räikkönen did not have an extra set of fresh tyres, meaning they were caught out by the fast-running Toro Rosso drivers, who took the third row on the grid. Neither Rosberg nor Hamilton were able to improve on their times in their second running. For the first time in 2015, it was not Hamilton who would start the race first on the grid, as Rosberg recorded the 16th pole position of his career.

Post-qualifying
Toro Rosso were delighted with their result, even though Carlos Sainz Jr. admitted he did not expect to fare as well in the race. Rosberg was satisfied with his first pole position of the season, commenting "of course I needed it sooner rather than later," referring to the 27-point gap in the championship to Hamilton. As pole position is statistically of crucial importance to winning the race, even more so than in Monaco, being first on the grid was considered to be a big advantage for Rosberg.

Race

At the start of the race, Lewis Hamilton did not get away well, having to yield second place to Sebastian Vettel while also coming under pressure from Valtteri Bottas. Nico Rosberg remained in front while the rest of the field got through the first corners without incidents. Kimi Räikkönen had a good first lap and moved up to fifth. The Toro Rosso drivers were unable to capitalise on their good qualifying performances and steadily headed down the order. As Rosberg was developing a lead, Hamilton told his team that overtaking Vettel on track was "impossible." Mercedes switched him to a three-stop strategy, starting on lap 14, but his first stop was marred by a problem with the wheel nut, not being able to get ahead of Rosberg who made a pit stop two laps later without problems. During the following laps, Hamilton tried to overtake Vettel on track, but to no avail. Unlike the top runners, Kimi Räikkönen did not take the medium tyres during his middle stint, but chose instead to run on the hard compound, meaning he would be a force to watch towards the end of the race.

Battles for position in midfield during the opening laps saw the two Lotus cars touch, damaging Pastor Maldonado's rear wing. When he came into the pit for his first stop, the entire right side plate of the wing was taken off, later forcing him to retire on lap 47. Fernando Alonso had previously become the first retirement of the race when his brake failed due to a torn-off visor lodging in his rear brake. When he came into the pit lane on lap 28, he overshot his pit box and hit a mechanic, and was unable to continue. Red Bull, who had a troublesome weekend, qualifying behind their sister team Toro Rosso, made up for lost ground and moved ahead to eventually finish seventh and tenth.

Up in front, Hamilton put his three-stop strategy to good use, consistently setting the fastest laps on track. On lap 46, Rosberg made a pit stop for the second and final time, emerging just a few seconds ahead of Hamilton, who quickly moved past him into the lead. Hamilton came in for his last stop on lap 51, easily retaining second place in front of Vettel's Ferrari. He subsequently tried to close the gap to Rosberg in front, but a 19-second lead proved impossible to overcome in the remaining 14 laps. Räikkönen had closed in on Valtteri Bottas and tried to overtake him during the last laps of the race, but was eventually unable to do so, leaving him in fifth position, lamenting his poor qualifying performance. As the race drew to a close, Rosberg crossed the line for his first victory of the season and the ninth of his career. Rosberg's victory made him the ninth different winner of the Spanish Grand Prix in as many years.

Post-race
Race winner Nico Rosberg said he had a "perfect weekend" during the podium interview conducted by Spanish TV presenter Maria Serrat. At the official post-race press conference, Lewis Hamilton conceded that it had "been a long time since I've had such a poor start" and went on to explain how difficult it is to overtake on the circuit. Sebastian Vettel admitted that had Hamilton's first stop not gone wrong, it would have been unlikely to stay ahead of him at that point.

Kimi Räikkönen, who had decided to drive with the old setup of the car, later stated that he had made a "sacrifice" for the team, saying "I think we learned a lot from going for two separate cars following yesterday and today so I'm more confident we can see things more balanced." He went on to point out that the characteristics of the circuit suited Mercedes more than Ferrari, as they had more downforce and raw speed, stating he was not too concerned with the "bigger than normal" gap, after Vettel had finished 45 seconds behind Rosberg.

Following another difficult weekend and constant problems with their underpowered Renault power units, Red Bull repeated their threats voiced earlier in the season to exit the sport. Their motorsport advisor Helmut Marko was quoted saying: "If we don't have a competitive engine in the near future, then either Audi is coming or we are out." Audi had just two weeks earlier stated that it had "no plans to enter Formula 1." Team principal Christian Horner had earlier declared the  season a "write-off" based on their engine reliability issues.

Classification

Qualifying

Race

Championship standings after the race

Drivers' Championship standings

Constructors' Championship standings

 Note: Only the top five positions are included for both sets of standings.

See also 
 2015 Catalunya GP2 Series round
 2015 Catalunya GP3 Series round

References

External links
 Event site at Formula1.com

Spanish
Spanish Grand Prix
Grand Prix
May 2015 sports events in Spain